Appleton is an unincorporated community in Lawrence County, Tennessee, United States.

Notes

External links
Sugar Creek Engagement

Unincorporated communities in Lawrence County, Tennessee
Unincorporated communities in Tennessee